Norape walkeri is a moth of the Megalopygidae family. It was described by Arthur Gardiner Butler in 1877. It is found from Mexico to the Amazon region.

References

Moths described in 1877
Megalopygidae